Troy Downing (born March 4, 1967) is an American politician and businessman serving as the Montana state auditor. Prior to the 2020 election, Downing worked as a real estate developer and technology entrepreneur.

Early life and education 
Downing is a native of Indio, California. He earned a Bachelor of Science in applied mathematics and computer science from New York University.

Career 
After college, Downing founded WebCal, a web calendar company that was later acquired by Yahoo!. Downing enlisted in the United States Air Force after the September 11 attacks. During his service, Downing worked as a pilot and engineer and was deployed to Afghanistan twice. Downing is the founder and CEO of AC Self Storage Solutions, a self-storage and real estate investment firm based in Carlsbad, California.

Downing was a candidate in the 2018 United States Senate election in Montana, placing third in the Republican primary. Downing was elected Montana state auditor in the 2020 election.

Personal life 
Downing built a vacation home in Big Sky, Montana in 2000 and moved there full-time in 2009. In 2005, Downing was accused of abuse and failure to pay child support by an ex-wife. During the 2020 election, after court documents were released, he denied the allegations.

In 2017, Downing was charged with hunting license violations.

Downing and his wife, Heather, have four children.

References 

1967 births
Businesspeople from California
Businesspeople from Montana
Candidates in the 2018 United States Senate elections
Living people
Montana Republicans
New York University alumni
People from Carlsbad, California
People from Indio, California